The Austrian Netherlands was the territory of the Burgundian Circle of the Holy Roman Empire between 1714 and 1797. The period began with the Austrian acquisition of the former Spanish Netherlands under the Treaty of Rastatt in 1714 and lasted until Revolutionary France  annexed the territory during the aftermath of the Battle of Sprimont in 1794 and the Peace of Basel in 1795. Austria, however, did not relinquish its claim over the province until 1797 in the Treaty of Campo Formio.

History

Under the Treaty of Rastatt (1714), following the War of the Spanish Succession, the surviving portions of the Spanish Netherlands were ceded to Austria. The Circle continued to give a single seat to the Reichstag to its owner, now the Emperor himself as alleged Duke of Burgundy. Administratively, the country was divided in four traditional duchies, three counties and various lordships.

Brabant Revolution 

In the 1780s, opposition emerged to the liberal reforms of Emperor Joseph II, which were perceived as an attack on the Catholic Church and the traditional institutions in the Austrian Netherlands. Resistance, focused in the autonomous and wealthy Duchy of Brabant and County of Flanders, grew. In the aftermath of rioting and disruption, known as the Small Revolution, in 1787, many of opponents took refuge in the neighboring Dutch Republic where they formed a rebel army. Soon after the outbreak of the French and Liège revolutions, the émigré army crossed into the Austrian Netherlands and decisively defeated the Austrians at the Battle of Turnhout on 27 October 1789. The rebels, supported by uprisings across the territory, soon took control over much of the territory and proclaimed independence. Despite the tacit support of Prussia, the independent United Belgian States, established in January 1790, received no foreign recognition and soon became divided along ideological lines. The Vonckists, led by Jan Frans Vonck, advocated progressive and liberal government, whereas the Statists, led by Hendrik Van der Noot, were staunchly conservative and supported by the Church. The Statists, who had a wider base of support, soon drove the Vonckists into exile through terror.

By mid-1790, Habsburg Austria ended its war with the Ottoman Empire and prepared to suppress the rebels. The new Holy Roman Emperor, Leopold II, was also a liberal and proposed an amnesty for the rebels. After defeating a Statist army at the Battle of Falmagne (22 September 1790), the territory was soon overrun and the revolution was defeated by December. The Austrian reestablishment was short-lived, however, and the territory was overrun by the French in 1794 (during the War of the First Coalition) after the 
Battle of Fleurus.

Imperial Councillors of State
The Councillors of state acted as government, and formed the council by imperial consent:
 The Baron Franz von Reischach, Imperial Diplomat
 Cardinal von Migazzi
 Cardinal von Frankenberg
 the Baron of Gottignies, Imperial Lord Chamberlain
 Philippe von Cobenzl, vice Chancellor of the Imperial Council of State.
 Henri d'Ognies, Prince of Grimberghen, Imperial Lord Chamberlain
 the Count of Neny; president of the Privy Council, member of the Imperial Council of State
 the Count of Woestenraedt, Imperial Lord Chamberlain.
 the Marquess of Chasteler, Lord Chamberlain
 the Count of Gomegnies, President of the Council of Hainaut
 the Viscount of Villers; Imperial Treasurer General
 Franz Joseph, Prince of Gavre: Grand Marshall of the Imperial Court of the Archduchess.

French rule

1794 was the third year of the War of the First Coalition. After the Battle of Fleurus (26 June), the Austrians gave up on contesting the Low Countries, and left it to the French. After three months of pure military occupation, on 15 October an Administration centrale et supérieure de la Belgique was installed. On 1 October 1795 the departments were activated and the definitive annexation started, liquidating the Belgian Governing Council, which ceased on 22 November. France annexed the Austrian Netherlands from the Holy Roman Empire and integrated them into the French Republic. The commissioner of the Directory, Louis Ghislain de Bouteville-Dumetz, finished his work on January 20, 1797, after which no common Belgian authority remained.

Notes

Citations

Sources 
 Heinrich Benedikt. Als Belgien österreichisch war. Herold, Vienna, 1965.

 
Netherlands
Early Modern Luxembourg
Former polities in the Netherlands
Netherlands
18th century in the Southern Netherlands
18th century in the Habsburg monarchy
18th century in Luxembourg
States and territories established in 1714
States and territories disestablished in 1797
1714 establishments in the Holy Roman Empire
1797 disestablishments in the Holy Roman Empire